I-M-R is a German darkwave/neofolk music project, founded 2011 by ex-In My Rosary mastermind Ralf Jesek.
After the disbandment of In My Rosary in November 2011, Ralf and his former live guest musicians Martin von Arndt (also member of the avant-garde/industrial band Printed At Bismarck's Death), Holger Diener and Hansi Huenig decided to continue the artistic idea as a band.

In November 2012 I-M-R released their debut album "Letters from the Paper Garden", which was supported by some international guests such as Elena Alice Fossi (Italy, Kirlian Camera), Isabelle Dekeyser (Belgium, The Breath Of Life), Stan_I & MS (Russia, Stillife), Sara Noxx (Germany) or Paul Roland (England).

Gallery

Discography
I-M-R
 2012 Letters from the Paper Garden (CD)
 2014 InOutSide (CD)
 2017 25-20-15 (CD)
 2020 Follow The Ruins EP (CD

Associated releases:
 
In My Rosary
 1993 Those Silent Years (CD)
 1994 Under the Mask of Stone (CD)
 1995 Strange EP (CD)
 1996 Farewell to Nothing (CD)
 1997 Against the Grain (CD)
 1999 A Collection of Fading Moments (CD)
 2002 The Shades of Cats (CD)
 2004 Greetings From the Past (CD)
 2004 Your World is a Flower (CD)
 2007 15 (CD)
 2010 Retro (CD)

Derrière le Miroir
 1993 Alibis (CD)
 1993 Pregnant EP (CD)
 1994 A Notion of Light (MCD)
 1995 Deep (CD)
 1996 Thieves & Kisses (CD)
 1997 Selected 1992-1995 (CD)
 2016 In Flux (CD) 
 2016 A Handful of Memories (Vinyl LP)

Mary's Comic
 2007 - Perfect Vacation (CD)

Printed At Bismarck's Death
 1986/1993 Fierceness Of The Immortal Charisma (LP/CD)
 1992 Via Lacrimosa (CD)
 1993 Ten Movements on the Matrix of a Symbol (CD)
 1997 Chamber Music for those Absent (CD)

References

External links
Official I-M-R website
I-M-R at Discogs.com

German dark wave musical groups